Presidential elections were held in Chile on 4 September 1964. The result was a victory for Eduardo Frei Montalva of the Christian Democratic Party, who received 56% of the vote.

Electoral system
The elections were held using the absolute majority system, under which a candidate had to receive over 50% of the popular vote to be elected. If no candidate received over 50% of the vote, both houses of the National Congress would come together to vote on the two candidates who received the most votes.

Campaign
The Church Committee of the US Senate revealed in 1975 that the Central Intelligence Agency interfered substantially with the election to prevent the accession of marxist Salvador Allende. The CIA secretly funded more than half of Frei's campaign and supported an array of pro-Christian Democratic groups. Two other political parties were funded as well in an attempt to spread the vote. The CIA's assistance to Frei took the form of polling, voter registration and get out the vote drives, in addition to covert propaganda.

The US was countering the influence of the Soviet Union, who supported Allende with $50,000 to $400,000 every year between 1960 and 1969. In total the CIA spent $3 million in the 1964 elections, more money than Lyndon B. Johnson spent on his 1964 presidential campaign.

Results

References

Presidential elections in Chile
Chile
President
Chile